The 1958 Football Championship of UkrSSR were part of the 1958 Soviet republican football competitions in the Soviet Ukraine.

First group stage

Group 1

Group 2

Group 3

Group 4

Group 5

Group 6

Group 7

Group 8

Group 9

Group 10

Second group stage

Group 1

Group 2

Final

Promotion play-off
 FC Chornomorets Odesa – FC Mashynobudivnyk Kyiv 3:0 2:2

Promoted
Arsenal Kyiv, Avanhard Zhytomyr (6th in group 1), Avanhard Kryvyi Rih, Avanhard Ternopil (3rd in group 1), Shakhtar Horlivka (6th in group 10)

Ukrainian clubs at the All-Union level
The Ukrainian SSR was presented with 24 teams of masters (exhibition teams) at the All-Union level: 

Group A: Dynamo Kyiv, Shakhtar Stalino

Group B: SKVO Odesa, Avanhard Mykolaiv, Spartak Kherson, Zirka Kirovohrad  // SCCF Sevastopol, Metalurh Zaporizhia, Trudovi Rezervy Luhansk, Kolhospnyk Poltava, Metalurh Dnipropetrovsk, Avanhard Kharkiv, Kolhospnyk Cherkasy, Khimik Dniprodzerzhynsk, Avanhard Simferopol // SKVO Lviv, Lokomotyv Vinnytsia, Spartak Uzhhorod, Spartak Stanislav, SKVO Kyiv, Chornomorets Odesa, Kolhospnyk Rivno // Lokomotyv Stalino, Shakhtar Kadiivka

References

External links
 1958. Football Championship of the UkrSSR (1958. Первенство УССР.) Luhansk Nash Futbol.
 Group 1: ukr-football.org.ua
 Group 2: ukr-football.org.ua
 Group 3: ukr-football.org.ua
 Group 4: ukr-football.org.ua
 Group 5: ukr-football.org.ua
 Group 6: ukr-football.org.ua
 Final: ukr-football.org.ua

Ukraine
Championship
Football Championship of the Ukrainian SSR